Festuca alpina, also known as the alphine fescue, is a species of grass in the genus Festuca. It grows in rocky habitats in many of the mountains chains across Europe. in the countries of Austria, Czechoslovakia, France, Germany, Italy, Spain, Switzerland and Yugoslavia.

When regarded as an aggregate group, the Festuca alpina group includes a number of other taxa, with Festuca alfrediana as the most notable.

Characteristics 
Festuca alpina can grow up to 6 to 20 centimetres high. Its leaves are curled into bristles, are less than 0.5 millimeters wide, and have a green hue. Leaf sheaths of non-flowering shoots are closed to about the middle. Ligules are less than 0.5 milimeters long, its panicles are 1.5 to 3 centimetres long, and its spikelets are 6 centimeters long in a pale green hue. Lemmas are about 3.5 to 4.2 millimeters in length, with awns about 3 to 4 millimeters long. Its anthers are between 0.8 to 1.5 millimeters in length (rarely up to 2mm), while its ovaries are glabrous. Flowering period: July to August.

References

alpina
Grasses of Europe